

P

 P (2005)
 PK (2014)
 P.S. (2004)
 P.S. Your Cat Is Dead (2002)
 P.S. I Love You (2008)
 P2 (2007)

Pa

 Pa Paandi (2017)
 Pa Va (2016)

Paa

 Paa (2009)
 Paadam (2018)
 Paadam Onnu: Oru Vilapam (2003)
 Paadasaram (1978)
 Paadatha Thenikkal (1988)
 Paadha Kaanikkai (1962)
 Paadhai Theriyudhu Paar (1960)
 Paadhukaappu (1970)
 Paadu Nilave (1987)
 Paadum Vaanampadi (1985)
 Paagalpan (2001)
 Paagan (2012)
 Paaladai (1967)
 Paalai (2011)
 Paalam: (1983 & 1990)
 Paalattu Kunjikannan (1980)
 Paalayam (1994)
 Paalige Bandadde Panchamrutha (1963)
 Paalkkadal (1976)
 Paambhu Sattai (2017)
 Paan Singh Tomar (2012)
 Paanai Pidithaval Bhaagyasaali (1958)
 Paanch (2003)
 Paanch Adhyay (2012)
 Paanch Dushman (1973)
 Paanch Fauladi (1988)
 Paanch Ghantey Mien Paanch Crore (2012)
 Paanch Qaidi (1981)
 Paandav (1995)
 Paandi Nattu Thangam (1989)
 Paangshu (2020)
 Paanjajanyam (1982)
 Paano Kita Iibigin (2007)
 Paano ang Puso Ko? (1997)
 Paano na Kaya (2010)

Pab-Pac

 Pabitra Papi (1997)
 Pablo (2012)
 Pacar Ketinggalan Kereta (1989)
 Pacemaker (2012)
 Pachai Engira Kaathu (2012)
 Pachai Kodi (1990)
 Pachai Nirame (2008)
 Pachai Vilakku (2020)
 Pachhai Vilakku (1964)
 Pachaikili Muthucharam (2007)
 Pachakuthira (2006)
 Pachamama (2018)
 Pachamarathanalil (2008)
 Pachani Kapuram (1985)
 Pachanottukal (1973)
 Pachchak Kuthira (2006)
 Pachhadlela (2004)
 Pachuvum Kovalanum (2011)
 Pacientka Dr. Hegla (1940)
 Pacific 231 (1949)
 Pacific Banana (1981)
 Pacific Blackout (1941)
 Pacific Heights (1990)
 Pacific Palisades (1990)
 Pacific Rim (2013)
 Pacific Rim: Uprising (2018)
 Pacific Vibrations (1970)
 The Pacifier (2005)
 The Pack: (1977, 2010 & 2015)
 Pack Train (1953)
 Pack Up Your Troubles: (1932, 1939 & 1940)
 The Package: (1989, 2013 & 2018)
 Packages from Daddy (2016)
 Packed in a Trunk: The Lost Art of Edith Lake Wilkinson (2015)
 Packin' It In (1983 TV)
 Packing the Monkeys, Again! (2004)
 Paco (2009)
 Paco the Elegant (1952)
 Paco de Lucía: La búsqueda (2014)
 Paco and the Magical Book (2008)
 Pacquiao: The Movie (2006)
 The Pact: (2002 TV, 2003, 2006 & 2012)
 The Pact 2 (2014)
 Pact with the Devil: (1950 & 2004)

Pad-Pay

 Paddington (2014)
 Paddington 2 (2017)
 Padre Padrone (1977)
 Padre Pio (2022)
 Pagal Nilavu (1985)
 Paganini: (1923, 1934 & 1989)
 A Page of Madness (1926)
 The Page Turner (2006)
 The Pagemaster (1994)
 Paheli (2005)
 Paid in Full: (1914, 1919, 1950 & 2002)
 Pain & Gain (2013)
 Pain and Glory (2019)
 Painful Indifference (1987)
 Painkiller Jane (2005 TV)
 Paint (TBD)
 Paint Your Wagon (1969)
 Painted Angels (1997)
 The Painted Bird (2019)
 The Painted Desert (1931)
 Painted Skin: (1992 & 2008)
 Painted Skin: The Resurrection (2012)
 The Painted Veil: (1934 & 2006)
 The Painter and the Thief (2020)
 Painters Painting (1972)
 Paisan (1946)
 The Pajama Game (1957)
 Pajama Party (1964)
 The Pale Blue Eye (2022)
 The Pale Door (2020)
 Pale Flower (1964)
 Pale Moon (2014)
 Pale Rider (1985)
 The Paleface: (1922 & 1948)
 Palindromes (2004)
 The Pallbearer (1996)
 The Palm Beach Story (1942)
 Palm Springs: (1936 & 2020)
 Palm Springs Weekend (1963)
 Palmetto (1998)
 Palo Alto: (2007 & 2013)
 Palooka (1934)
 Palookaville (1995)
 Pals (1925)
 Pan: (1922, 1995 & 2015)
 Pan's Labyrinth (2006)
 Panama Hattie (1942)
 Panda and the Magic Serpent (1958)
 Panda! Go, Panda! (1972)
 Pandaemonium (2000)
 Pandemic (2016)
 Pandemonium: (1982 & 1987)
 Pandora and the Flying Dutchman (1951)
 Pandora's Box: (1929 & 2008)
 Pandorum (2009)
 Panic: (1928, 1963, 1982 & 2000)
 Panic Beats (1983)
 Panic High School (1978)
 The Panic in Needle Park (1971)
 Panic Room (2002)
 Panic in the Streets (1950)
 Panic in Year Zero! (1962)
 Panther (1995)
 Panther Girl of the Kongo (1955)
 Le Paon de Nuit (2015)
 Paparazzi: (1998 French, 1998 Italian & 2004)
 The Paper (1994)
 The Paper Chase (1973)
 Paper Clips Project (2004)
 Paper Heart (2009)
 Paper Lion (1968)
 Paper Man: (1971 & 2009)
 The Paper Man: (1963 & 2020)
 Paper Moon (1973)
 Paper Spiders (2020)
 The Paper Tigers (2020)
 Paper Towns (1973)
 The Paperboy: (1994 & 2012)
 Paperboys (2011)
 Paperhouse (1989)
 Papillon: (1973 & 2018)
 Pappa ante Portas (1991)
 Paprika: (2006 & 1991)
 The Parade (2011)
 Parade: (1974 & 2009)
 The Paradine Case (1947)
 Paradise: (1982 & 1991)
 Paradise Canyon (1935)
 Paradise Grove (2003)
 Paradise Hills (2019)
 Paradise Lost: (1940 & 2011) 
 Paradise Lost 2: Revelations (2000)
 Paradise Lost 3: Purgatory (2011)
 Paradise Lost: The Child Murders at Robin Hood Hills (1996)
 Paradise Murdered (2007)
 Paradise Now (2005)
 Paradise Road: (1936 & 1997)
 Paradise, Hawaiian Style (1966)
 Paradox: (2010 TV, 2016 & 2017)
 Paragraph 175 (2000)
 Parajanov: The Last Spring (1992)
 The Parallax View (1974)
 Parallel (2018)
 Parallel Mothers (2021)
 The Paramedic (2020)
 Paranoia: (1967, 1969, 1970 & 2013)
 Paranoia 1.0 (2004)
 Paranoiac (1963)
 Paranoid (2000)
 Paranoid Park (2007)
 Paranormal Activity series:
 Paranormal Activity (2007)
 Paranormal Activity 2 (2010)
 Paranormal Activity 3 (2011)
 Paranormal Activity 4 (2012)
 Paranormal Activity: The Marked Ones (2014)
 Paranormal Activity: The Ghost Dimension (2015)
 Paranormal Activity: Next of Kin (2021)
 Paranormal Activity 2: Tokyo Night (2010)
 Paranormal Entity (2011)
 ParaNorman (2012)
 Parasite: (1982 & 2019)
 Parasyte: Part 1 (2014)
 Parasyte: Part 2 (2015)
 Pardes: (1950 & 1997)
 Pardners (1956)
 Pardon My Sarong (1942)
 Pardon Us (1931)
 The Parent Trap series:
 The Parent Trap: (1961 & 1998)
 The Parent Trap II (1986 TV)
 Parent Trap III (1989 TV)
 Parent Trap: Hawaiian Honeymoon (1989 TV)
 Parental Guidance (2012)
 Parenthood (1989)
 Parents: (1989, 2007 & 2016)
 Les Parents terribles: (1948 & 1980 TV)
 Paris After Dark (1943)
 Paris Belongs to Us (1961)
 Paris Holiday: (1958 & 2015)
 Paris Is Burning (1990)
 Paris Qui Dort (1924)
 Paris When It Sizzles (1964)
 Paris, je t'aime (2006)
 Paris, Texas (1984)
 Paris-Willouby (2015)
 The Park: (2003 & 2007)
 The Park Is Mine (1986 TV)
 Parker: (1984 & 2013)
 The Parole Officer (2001)
 The Parson's Widow (1920)
 Parthale Paravasam (2001)
 Partie de cartes (1895)
 Parting Glances (1986)
 Partition: (1987 & 2007)
 Partly Cloudy (2009)
 Partly Cloudy with Sunny Spells (2015)
 Partner: (1968, 2007 & 2008)
 Partners: (1932, 1982 & 2009)
 Parts: The Clonus Horror (1979)
 The Party: (1968, 1990 & 2017)
 The Party Animal (1984)
 Party Girl: (1930, 1958, 1995 & 2014)
 The Party and the Guests (1966)
 The Party at Kitty and Stud's (1970)
 Party Monster (2003)
 Party Monster: The Shockumentary (1998)
 Pasáček z doliny (1984)
 El pasajero clandestino (1995)
 Pascual Duarte (1976)
 Pasolini (2014)
 Pass the Gravy (1928)
 A Passage to India (1984)
 Passage to Marseille (1944)
 Passages: (2004 & 2008)
 Passchendaele (2008)
 Passenger: (1963 & 2009)
 The Passenger: (1975, 2005 Éric Caravaca & 2005 François Rotger)
 Passenger 57 (1992)
 The Passenger – Welcome to Germany (1988)
 The Passengers: (1977 & 1999)
 Passengers: (2008 & 2016)
 Passing (2021)
 The Passing: (1983 & 2015) 
 The Passing of Hell's Crown (1916)
 The Passing of the Third Floor Back: (1918 & 1935)
 Passion: (1925, 1954, 1982, 1998, 1999, 2005 & 2012)
 The Passion of Anna (1969)
 The Passion of the Christ (2004)
 The Passion of Darkly Noon (1995)
 Passion Fish (1992)
 The Passion of Joan of Arc (1928)
 Passion Play (2011)
 Passionada (2002)
 The Passionate Pursuits of Angela Bowen (2016)
 Passions (1994)
 Passport to Paris (1999)
 Passport to Pimlico (1948)
 The Password is Courage (1962)
 The Past-Master (1970)
 Pat Garrett and Billy the Kid (1973)
 Pat and Mike (1952)
 Patagonia (2010)
 Patch Adams (1998)
 A Patch of Blue (1965)
 The Patchwork Girl of Oz (1914)
 The Patent Leather Kid (1927)
 Paternity (1981)
 Paterno (2018 TV)
 Paterson (2016)
 The Path to Power (1996)
 The Path to Ultimate Strength (1996)
 Path to War (2002 TV)
 Pather Panchali (1955)
 Pathfinder: (1987 & 2007)
 The Pathfinder: (1952, 1987 & 1996 TV)
 Pathology (2008)
 Paths of Glory (1957)
 Patient Seven (2016)
 Patlabor: The Movie (1989)
 Patrick: (1978 & 2013)
 Patrick Still Lives (1980)
 The Patriot: (1928, 1938, 1953, 1986, 1998 & 2000)
 Patriot Games (1992)
 Patriotism: (1918 & 1966)
 Patriots Day (2016)
 El Patrullero (1991)
 The Patsy: (1928 & 1964)
 Patti Smith: Dream of Life (2008)
 Patton (1970)
 Patty Hearst (1988)
 Paul (2011)
 Paul Blart: Mall Cop (2009)
 Paul Blart: Mall Cop 2 (2015)
 Paul Bunyan (1958)
 Paul, Apostle of Christ (2018)
 Paulie (1998)
 Pauline at the Beach (1983)
 Pauly Shore Is Dead (2003)
 The Pauper Millionaire (1922)
 Pauvre Pierrot (1892)
 Pavarotti (2019)
 PAW Patrol: The Movie (2021)
 Pawn: (2013 & 2020)
 Pawn Sacrifice (2014)
 The Pawnbroker (1964)
 The Pawnshop (1916)
 Paws of Fury: The Legend of Hank (2022)
 Pay Day: (1918, 1922 & 1972)
 Pay the Ghost (2015)
 Pay It Forward (2000)
 Payback: (1995, 1999, 2010 & 2012)
 Paycheck (2003)
 Payday: (1944, 1973 & 2018) 
 Payment on Demand (1951)

Pc–Pe

 PCU (1994)
 Peace on Earth (1939)
 Peaceful Warrior (2006)
 The Peacemaker: (1922, 1956 & 1997)
 Peacemaker (1990)
 The Peach Girl (1931)
 Peacock: (2005 & 2010)
 The Peanut Butter Falcon (2019)
 The Peanut Butter Solution (1985)
 The Peanuts Movie (2015)
 The Pear Tree (1998)
 Pearl: (2016 & 2022)
 The Pearl (1947)
 The Pearl Button (2015)
 The Pearl of Death (1944)
 Pearl Harbor (2001)
 Pearls of the Deep (1966)
 The Pearls of the Stone Man (2015)
 A Peasant on a Bicycle (1974)
 Peau d'Âne (1970)
 The Pebble and the Penguin (1996)
 Pecker (1998)
 Pedicab Driver (1989)
 Pee-wee's Big Adventure (1985)
 Pee-wee's Big Holiday (2016)
 Peeping Tom (1960)
 Peeples (2013)
 Peepli Live (2010)
 Peer Gynt: (1915, 1919 & 1934)
 Peggy Guggenheim: Art Addict (2015)
 Peggy Sue Got Married (1986)
 Peking Express (1951)
 Peking Opera Blues (1986)
 The Pelican (1973)
 Pelican Blood: (2010 & 2019)
 The Pelican Brief (1993)
 Pelicanman (2004)
 Pelle the Conqueror (1987)
 Peluca (2003)
 Penalty (2019)
 The Penalty: (1920 & 1941)
 Penalty Phase (1986) (TV)
 Penance Lane (2020)
 Penda's Fen (1974) (TV)
 Penelope: (1966 & 2008)
 Penguins of Madagascar (2014)
 Peninsula (2020)
 Penitentiary: (1938 & 1979)
 Penn & Teller Get Killed (1989)
 Pennies from Heaven: (1936 & 1981)
 Penny Dreadful (2006)
 Penny Points to Paradise (1951)
 Penny Princess (1952)
 Penny Serenade (1941)
 Penrod and Sam: (1923, 1931 & 1937)
 Pensione paura (1978)
 The Pentagon Wars (1998) (TV)
 The People (1972) (TV)
 The People vs. George Lucas (2010)
 People I Know (2002)
 The People vs. Jean Harris (1981) (TV)
 The People vs. Larry Flynt (1996)
 People Like Us: (1980 & 2012)
 People of the Mountains (1942)
 The People Next Door: (1968 TV, 1970 & 1996 TV)
 People on Sunday (1930)
 The People That Time Forgot (1977)
 The People Under the Stairs (1991)
 People Will Talk (1951)
 People's Hero (1987)
 Pepe (1960)
 Peppermint (2018)
 Peppermint Candy (2000)
 Peppermint Soda (1977)
 Pequeña revancha (1986)
 Perazhagan (2004)
 Perceval le Gallois (1978)
 Percy: (1925, 1971, 1989 & 2020)
 Percy Jackson & the Olympians: The Lightning Thief (2010)
 Percy Jackson: Sea of Monsters (2013)
 Perdida: (1916, 2018 & 2019)
 Perdita Durango (1997)
 Le Père Noël a les yeux bleus (1969)
 Perfect: (1985, 2016 & 2018)
 Perfect Blue (1997)
 Perfect Blue: Yume Nara Samete (2002)
 A Perfect Couple (1979)
 The Perfect Couple (2007)
 Perfect Creature (2007)
 Perfect Day: (1929 & 2005 TV)
 Perfect Friday (1970)
 A Perfect Getaway (2009)
 The Perfect Guy: (1998 & 2015)
 Perfect High (2015)
 The Perfect Host (2010)
 Perfect Imperfection (2016)
 A Perfect Little Man (1999)
 A Perfect Man: (2013 & 2015)
 The Perfect Man: (1939 & 2005)
 A Perfect Murder (1998)
 The Perfect Score (2004)
 Perfect Sense (2011)
 The Perfect Son (2000)
 The Perfect Storm (2000)
 Perfect Stranger (2007)
 Perfect Understanding (1933)
 A Perfect World (1993)
 The Perfection (2018)
 Performance (1970)
 Perfume (2001)
 Perfume: The Story of a Murderer (2006)
 Perhaps Love: (1987 & 2005)
 The Perils of Gwendoline in the Land of the Yik-Yak (1984)
 The Perils of Pauline: (1914, 1933, 1947 & 1967)
 The Perks of Being a Wallflower (2012)
 Permanent Midnight (1998)
 Permanent Record (1988)
 Permanent Vacation: (1980 & 2007)
 Permission to Kill (1975)
 Perpetual Motion (2005)
 The Persecution and Assassination of Jean-Paul Marat as Performed by the Inmates of the Asylum at Charenton Under the Direction of the Marquis de Sade (1967)
 Persepolis (2007)
 Persona (1966)
 Personal Best (1982)
 The Personal History of David Copperfield (2019)
 A Personal Journey with Martin Scorsese Through American Movies (1995) (TV)
 Personal Problems (1980)
 Personal Services (1987)
 Personal Shopper (2016)
 Personal Velocity: Three Portraits (2002)
 Persuasion: (1995 TV & 2007 TV)
 The Pest: (1917, 1922 & 1997)
 Petals on the Wind (2014)
 Pet Sematary: (1989 & 2019)
 Pet Sematary Two (1992)
 Pet Shop (1994)
 Pete, Pearl & the Pole (1973)
 Pete's Dragon: (1977 & 2016)
 Pete's Meteor (1998)
 Peter in Magicland (1990)
 Peter Pan: (1924, 1953, 1988 & 2003)
 Peter the Pirate (1925)
 Peter Rabbit (2018)
 Peter Rabbit 2: The Runaway (2021)
 Peter von Kant (2022)
 Peter and the Wolf: (1946 & 2006)
 Le Petit Soldat (1963)
 Petite Maman (2021)
 The Petrified Forest: (1936 & 1973)
 Petrov's Flu (2021)
 Pets or Meat: The Return to Flint (1992) (TV)
 Pettin' in the Park (1934)
 Petulia (1968)
 Le Peuple Migrateur (2001)
 Peyton Place (1957)
 Pépé le Moko (1937)
 La Pêche aux poissons rouges (1895)

Pg-Ph

 PG: Psycho Goreman (2020)
 Phaedra (1962)
 Phantasm series:
 Phantasm (1979)
 Phantasm II (1988)
 Phantasm III: Lord of the Dead (1994)
 Phantasm IV: Oblivion (1998)
 Phantasm: Ravager (2016)
 Phantom: (1922, 2002, 2013 & 2015)
 The Phantom: (1931 & 1996)
 The Phantom from 10,000 Leagues (1955)
 The Phantom Carriage: (1921 & 1958)
 The Phantom of Hollywood (1974 TV)
 Phantom Lady (1944)
 The Phantom Lady (1945)
 The Phantom of Liberty (1974)
 The Phantom Lover (1995)
 Phantom of the Mall: Eric's Revenge (1989)
 Phantom of the Megaplex (2000 TV)
 The Phantom of the Moulin Rouge (1925)
 The Phantom of the Open (2021)
 The Phantom of the Opera: (1925, 1943, 1962, 1989, 1998 & 2004)
 The Phantom of the Operetta: (1955 & 1960)
 Phantom of the Paradise (1974)
 The Phantom Planet (1961)
 The Phantom of Soho (1964)
 Phantom Thread (2017)
 The Phantom Tollbooth (1970)
 Phantoms (1998)
 Phase IV: (1974 & 2002)
 Phat Girlz (2006)
 Phenomena (1985)
 Phenomenon (1996)
 Phenomenon II (2003 TV)
 Phil (2019)
 Phil the Alien (2004)
 Philomena (2013)
 Philadelphia (1993)
 The Philadelphia Experiment (1984)
 The Philadelphia Story (1940)
 Phileine Says Sorry (2003)
 Philosophy of a Knife (2008)
 Phineas and Ferb the Movie: Across the 2nd Dimension (2011)
 Phineas and Ferb the Movie: Candace Against the Universe (2020)
 Phir Milenge (2004)
 Phobia: (1980, 1988, 2008, 2013 & 2016)
 Phoebe in Wonderland (2009)
 Phoenix: (1998, 2006 & 2014)
 The Phoenix (1959)
 Phone (2002)
 The Phone (2015)
 Phone Booth (2002)
 The Photographical Congress Arrives in Lyon (1895)
 Photographing Fairies (1997)
 Photographing a Ghost (1898)
 Phurbu & Tenzin (2014)
 The Phynx (1970)

Pi

 Pi (1998)
 Pi Day Die Day (2016)

Pia-Piz

 The Pianist: (1991, 1998 & 2002)
 Piange... il telefono (1975)
 The Piano (1993)
 Piano Blues (2003)
 Piano Girl (2009)
 Piano Mover (1932)
 A Piano for Mrs. Cimino (1982)
 Piano Piano Kid (1991)
 The Piano Teacher (2001)
 Pianoforte (1984)
 Pianomania (2009)
 Piazza Fontana: The Italian Conspiracy (2012)
 Picasso (2019)
 Picasso at the Lapin Agile (2008)
 Picasso Trigger (1988)
 Picasso's Face (2000)
 Piccadilly (1929)
 Piccadilly Incident (1946)
 The Pick-up Artist (1987)
 Picking Up the Pieces (2000)
 Pickpocket (1959)
 Pickpockets (2018)
 Pickup on South Street (1953)
 The Pickwick Papers: (1913, 1952 & 1985)
 Picnic: (1955, 1975 & 1996)
 Picnic at Hanging Rock (1975)
 Picture Bride (1995)
 The Picture of Dorian Gray: (1913, 1915, 1916, 1917, 1918, 1945, 1976 TV & 2004)
 Picture Perfect: (1995 & 1997)
 Pictures of the Old World (1972)
 A Piece of the Action (1977)
 Piece of Cake (2015)
 Pieces (1982)
 Pieces of April (2003)
 Pieces of a Woman (2020)
 The Pied Piper: (1933, 1942, 1972 & 1986)
 Pied Piper of Cleveland (1955)
 The Pied Piper of Hamelin: (1918 & 1957 TV)
 Piercing (2018)
 Pierrepoint (2006)
 Pierrot le fou (1965)
 Pietà (2012)
 Pig: (1998, 2010, 2011, 2018 & 2021)
 The Pigeon Egg Strategy (1998)
 A Pigeon Sat on a Branch Reflecting on Existence (2014)
 Piglet's Big Movie (2003)
 Pigs: (1973, 1992 & 2007)
 Pigs and Battleships (1961)
 Pigs is Pigs (1937)
 Pigs in a Polka (1943)
 Pigskin Parade (1936)
 Pigsty (1969)
 Pihu (2018)
 Pilgrim (2000)
 The Pilgrim: (1923 & 2014)
 Pilgrim Hill (2013)
 The Pilgrim's Progress (2019)
 Pilgrim's Progress: Journey to Heaven (2008)
 Pilgrimage: (1933, 2001 & 2017)
 The Pillar of Fire (1899)
 The Pillow Book (1996)
 Pillow Talk (1959)
 Pimpernel Smith (1941)
 Pin (1989)
 Pin Cushion (2017)
 Pina (2011)
 Pineapple Express (2008)
 Piñero (2001)
 Ping Pong: (1986, 2002 & 2012)
 Pink: (2011 & 2016)
 The Pink Cloud (2021)
 Pink Dream (1932)
 Pink Five (2002)
 Pink Five Strikes Back (2004)
 Pink Flamingos (1972)
 Pink Floyd The Wall (1982)
 Pink Floyd: Live at Pompeii (1972)
 Pink and Gray (2016)
 The Pink Jungle (1968)
 The Pink Panther: (1963 & 2006)
 The Pink Panther 2 (2009)
 The Pink Panther Strikes Again (1976)
 Pink Skies Ahead (2020)
 The Pink Slippers (1927)
 Pinkeltje (1978)
 Pinky (1949)
 Pinocchio: (1940, 1967, 1968, 2002, 2008, 2012, 2019, 2022 live-action & 2022 animated)
 Pinocchio 3000 (2004)
 Pinocchio: A True Story (2022)
 Pinocchio and the Emperor of the Night (1987)
 Pinocchio in Outer Space (1965)
 Pinocchio's Revenge (1996)
 Pioneer Marshal (1949)
 Pipeline (2021)
 The Piper (2015)
 Pippi Goes on Board (1969)
 Pippi Longstocking: (1949, 1969 & 1997)
 Pippi on the Run (1970)
 Pippi in the South Seas (1970)
 Piranha series:
 Piranha: (1978, 1995 & 2010)
 Piranha II: The Spawning (1982)
 Piranha 3DD (2012)
 Piranhas (2019)
 The Pirate: (1947, 1973, 1978 & 1984)
 The Pirate Movie (1982)
 Pirates: (1986, 2005 & 2021)
 The Pirates (2014)
 Pirates II: Stagnetti's Revenge (2008)
 Pirates of the Caribbean series:
 Pirates of the Caribbean: The Curse of the Black Pearl (2003)
 Pirates of the Caribbean: Dead Man's Chest (2006)
 Pirates of the Caribbean: At World's End (2007)
 Pirates of the Caribbean: On Stranger Tides (2011)
 Pirates of the Caribbean: Dead Men Tell No Tales (2017)
 Pirates of Silicon Valley (1999) (TV)
 The Pirates Who Don't Do Anything: A VeggieTales Movie (2008)
 The Pirates! In an Adventure with Scientists! (2012)
 Pisaj (2004)
 La Piscine (1969)
 Pistachio – The Little Boy That Woodn't (2010)
 Pistol Opera (2001)
 The Pit: (1981 & 2020)
 The Pit and the Pendulum: (1913, 1961, 1964, 1991 & 2009)
 Pitch Black (2000)
 Pitch Perfect series:
 Pitch Perfect (2012)
 Pitch Perfect 2 (2015)
 Pitch Perfect 3 (2017)
 Pitfall: 1948 & 1962)
 Pithamagan (2003)
 Pittsburgh: (1942 & 2006)
 Pixel Perfect (2004) (TV)
 Pixels: (2010 & 2015)
 Pixie (2020)
 Pixies (2015)
 Pixote: The Law of the Weakest (1981)
 Pizza Connection (1985)
 Pizza Man: (1991 & 2011)

Pl

 A Place Between – The Story of an Adoption (2007)
 The Place Beyond the Pines (2012)
 A Place to Call Home: (1970 & 1987 TV)
 A Place Called Chiapas (1998)
 Place des Cordeliers à Lyon (1895)
 A Place for Annie (1994)
 A Place to Go (1963)
 A Place to Grow (1995)
 A Place in the Land (1998)
 A Place to Live (1941)
 A Place to Be Loved (1993)
 A Place for Lovers (1968)
 A Place Nearby (2000)
 A Place of One's Own (1945)
 The Place Promised in Our Early Days (2004)
 A Place in the Sun (1951)
 Places in the Heart (1984)
 Plague: (1979 & 2014)
 The Plague: (1992 & 2006)
 The Plagues of Breslau (2018)
 The Plague Dogs (1982)
 Plague Town (2008)
 The Plague of the Zombies (1966)
 The Plainsman: (1936 & 1966)
 Le Plaisir (1952)
 The Plan: (2014 & 2015)
 Plan 9 from Outer Space (1957)
 Plane Crazy (1928)
 Planes (2013)
 Planes: Fire & Rescue (2014)
 Planes, Trains and Automobiles (1987)
 Planes, Trains and Eric (2014)
 Planet 51 (2009)
 Planet of the Apes: (1968 & 2001)
Planet Terror (2007)
 Planet of the Vampires (1965)
 El Planeta (2021)
 The Plank: (1967 & 1979)
 The Planter's Wife: (1908 & 1952)
 Plants vs. Zombies (2006)
 The Plastic Age (1925)
 Platform: (1993 & 2000)
 The Platform (2019)
 Platinum Blonde (1931)
 Platoon (1986)
 Play Dirty (1969)
 Play It Again, Sam (1972)
 Play It to the Bone (2000)
 Play Misty for Me (1971)
 Playback (2012)
 The Player: (1953 & 1992)
 The Players Club (1998)
 Playground: (2009 & 2021)
 The Playhouse (1921)
 Playing Around (1930)
 Playing Beatie Bow (1986)
 Playing God: (1997 & 2021)
 Playing by Heart (1999)
 Playing for Keeps: (1986 & 2012)
 Playing the Victim (2006)
 Playtime (1967)
 Pleasantville (1998)
 Pleasant Goat and Big Big Wolf – Amazing Pleasant Goat (2015)
 Please Do Not Disturb (2010)
 Please Don't Eat the Daisies (1960)
 Please Give (2010)
 Please Speak Continuously and Describe Your Experiences as They Come to You (2019)
 Pleasure: (1931, 2013 & 2021)
 The Pleasure (1985)
 The Pleasure of Being Robbed (2008)
 Pleasure Factory (2007)
 The Pleasure Garden: (1925 & 1952)
 The Pledge (2001)
 Plot (1972)
 The Plow That Broke the Plains (1936)
 Ploy (2007)
 Plunder of Peach and Plum (1934)
 Plunder Road (1957)
 Plunkett & Macleane (1999)
 Plus One: (2008 & 2019)

Po

 Po čem muži touží (2018)
 Po di Sangui (1996)
 Po strništi bos (2017)

Poa-Poe

 Poacher (2018)
 The Poacher: (1926 & 1953)
 The Poacher from Egerland (1934)
 The Poacher of the Silver Wood (1957)
 The Poacher's Foster Daughter or Noble Millionaire (1949)
 The Poacher's Pardon (1912)
 Pobočník Jeho Výsosti (1933)
 Pobres habrá siempre (1958)
 Pocahontas: (1910, 1994 & 1995)
 Pocahontas II: Journey to a New World (1998)
 Pocahontas: The Legend (1995)
 The Pocatello Kid (1931)
 Pocket Gangsters (2015)
 Pocket Listing (2016)
 Pocket Maar: (1956 & 1974)
 Pocket Money (1972)
 Pocket Ninjas (1994)
 Pocketful of Miracles (1961)
 Pocong vs Kuntilanak (2008)
 Pod (2015)
 Pod banderą miłości (1929)
 Podaa Podi (2012)
 Podhale w ogniu (1956)
 Podhu Nalan Karudhi (2019)
 Podhuvaga Emmanasu Thangam (2017)
 Podia Ser Pior (2009)
 Podium (2004)
 Podkova (1913)
 Podmo Patar Jol (2015)
 Poem of the Sea (1958)
 Poesias Para Gael (2017)
 The Poet: (1956 & 2007)
 Poet Anderson: The Dream Walker (2014)
 The Poet and the Boy (2017)
 Poet on a Business Trip (2015)
 The Poet and the Little Mother (1959)
 Poet and Muse (1978)
 The Poet of the Peaks (1912)
 The Poet and the Tsar (1927)
 The Poet's Windfall (1918)
 Poeten og Lillemor i forårshumør (1961)
 Poeten og Lillemor og Lotte (1960)
 Poetic Justice (1993)
 Poetical Refugee (2001)
 Poetry (2010)
 Poetry in Motion (1982)
 Poetry of Witness (2015)

Poi-Pok

 Poi (2006)
 Poi Mugangal (1986)
 Poi Satchi (1982)
 Poi Solla Porom (2008)
 Poikkal Kudhirai (1983)
Poikkal Kudhirai (2022)
 The Point (2006)
 Point 905 (1960)
 Point of Betrayal (1995)
 Point Blank: (1967, 1998, 2010 & 2019)
 Point Break: (1991 & 2015)
 Point of Departure (1966 TV)
 Point Last Seen (1998)
 The Point Men: (1991 & TBD)
 Point of No Return: (1993 & 1995)
 Point of Order (1964)
 Point of Origin (2002)
 Point, Point, Comma... (1972)
 Point and Shoot (2014)
 Point of Terror (1971)
 Point of View (1965)
 The Point of View (1920)
 The Point! (1971)
 Pointed Heels (1929)
 The Pointer (1939)
 The Pointing Finger: (1919, 1922 & 1933)
 Points West (1929)
 The Pointsman (1986)
 Poison (1991)
 La Poison (1951)
 Poison Dust (2005)
 Poison Friends (2006)
 Poison Gas (1929)
 Poison Ivy series:
 Poison Ivy: (1985 TV & 1992)
 Poison Ivy II: Lily (1996)
 Poison Ivy: The New Seduction (1997)
 Poison Ivy: The Secret Society (2008 TV)
 Poison Pen: (1939 & 2014)
 The Poison Rose (2019)
 The Poison Tasters (1995)
 Poison in the Zoo (1952)
 The Poisoned Diamond (1933)
 The Poisoned Light (1921)
 Poisoned by Love: The Kern County Murders (1993 TV)
 Poisoned Paradise: The Forbidden Story of Monte Carlo (1924)
 The Poisoner (2006 TV)
 The Poisoned Stream (1921)
 Poisonous Roses (2018)
 Poisons or the World History of Poisoning (2001)
 Poitín (1978)
 Poka Makorer Ghor Bosoti (1996)
 Pokémon series:
 Pokémon 3: The Movie (2001)
 Pokémon 4Ever (2002)
 Pokémon: Arceus and the Jewel of Life (2009)
 Pokémon: Destiny Deoxys (2005)
 Pokémon: The First Movie (1999)
 Pokémon: Giratina and the Sky Warrior (2009)
 Pokémon Heroes (2003)
 Pokémon: Jirachi Wishmaker (2004)
 Pokémon: Lucario and the Mystery of Mew (2006)
 Pokémon: The Mastermind of Mirage Pokémon (2006 TV)
 Pokémon: The Movie 2000 (2000)
 Pokémon the Movie: Black - Victini and Reshiram (2011)
 Pokémon the Movie: Diancie and the Cocoon of Destruction (2014)
 Pokémon the Movie: Genesect and the Legend Awakened (2013)
 Pokémon the Movie: Hoopa and the Clash of Ages (2015)
 Pokémon the Movie: I Choose You! (2017)
 Pokémon the Movie: Kyurem vs. the Sword of Justice (2012)
 Pokémon: Mewtwo Strikes Back: Evolution (2020)
 Pokémon the Movie: The Power of Us (2018)
 Pokémon the Movie: Volcanion and the Mechanical Marvel (2016)
 Pokémon the Movie: White - Victini and Zekrom (2011)
 Pokémon Ranger and the Temple of the Sea (2007)
 Pokémon: The Rise of Darkrai (2008)
 Pokémon: Zoroark: Master of Illusions (2011)
 Poker (1951)
 Poker Alice (1987 TV)
 Poker in Bed (1974)
 The Poker Club (2008)
 Poker Face (2022)
 Poker Faces (1926)
 The Poker House (2008)
 Poker King (2009)
 Poker Night (2014)
 Pokhi (1998)
 Pokiri (2006)
 Pokiri Raja (1995)
 Pokkattadikkaari (1978)
 Pokkiri (2007)
 Pokkiri Raja: (1982, 2010 & 2016)
 Pokkiri Simon (2017)
 Pokkiri Thambi (1992)
 Pokkisham (2009)
 Pokkuveyil (1982)
 Pokrajina št. 2 (2008)
 The Pokrovsky Gate (1982)

Pol-Pom

 Pola Negri: Life Is a Dream in Cinema (2006)
 Pola X (1999)
 Pola's March (2001)
 Polam Pol (2016)
 Polanski Unauthorized (2009)
 Polar (2019)
 Polar Adventure (2015)
 The Polar Bear (1998)
 The Polar Bear King (1991)
 Polar Bears: A Summer Odyssey (2012)
 The Polar Express (2004)
 The Polar Star (1919)
 Polar Storm (2009)
 Polar Trappers (1938)
 Polaris (2016)
 Polaroid (2019)
 Polaroid Song (2012)
 Pole Poppenspäler (1954)
 Poley Poley Urey Mon (2011)
 Poli Huduga (1989)
 Policarpo (1959)
 Police: (1916, 1958, 1985 & 2005)
 Police Academy series:
 Police Academy (1984)
 Police Academy 2: Their First Assignment (1985)
 Police Academy 3: Back in Training (1986)
 Police Academy 4: Citizens on Patrol (1987)
 Police Academy 5: Assignment Miami Beach (1988)
 Police Academy 6: City Under Siege (1989)
 Police Academy 7: Mission to Moscow (1994)
 Police Aur Mujrim (1992)
 Police Beat (2005)
 Police Bharya (1990)
 Police Brothers (1992)
 Police Bullets (1942)
 Police Call (1933)
 Police Calling 091 (1960)
 Police Chief Antek (1935)
 Police Chief Pepe (1969)
 Police Court (1932)
 Police Crop: The Winchester Conspiracy (1990 TV)
 Police Force: An Inside Story (2004)
 Police Lockup (1992)
 Police Matthu Dada (1991)
 The Police Murderer (1994)
 Police Nurse (1963)
 Police Officer (1992)
 The Police Officer's Wife (2013)
 The Police Patrol (1925)
 Police Police (2010)
 Police Public (1990)
 Police Python 357 (1976)
 Police Quarters (2010)
 The Police Serve the Citizens? (1973)
 Police Spy 77 (1930)
 Police State: (1989 TV & 2017)
 Police Story (1979)
 Police Story series:
 Police Story (1987)
 Police Story 2 (1988)
 Police Story 2013 (2013)
 Police Story 3: Super Cop (1992)
 Police Story 4: First Strike (1996)
 Police Story series:
 Police Story (1996)
 Police Story 2 (2007)
 Police Story 3 (2011)
 Police Story: Confessions of a Lady Cop (1980 TV)
 The Police Tapes (1977 TV)
 The Police War (1979)
 Police Woman (1973)
 Policegiri (2013)
 Policekaran Magal (1962)
 Policeman (2011)
 The Policeman (1971)
 The Policeman of the 16th Precinct (1959)
 The Policeman's Lineage (2022)
 Policemen (1995)
 Policena Hendthi (1990)
 Policewala Gunda (1995)
 Policewoman (1974)
 Policewoman Centerfold (1983)
 Policewomen (1974)
 Poliche (1934)
 Policing the Plains (1927)
 Polikushka (1922)
 Polina (2016)
 Polis (2014)
 Polis Evo (2015)
 Polis Evo 2 (2018)
 Polis Is This: Charles Olson and the Persistence of Place (2007)
 Polish Blood (1934)
 The Polish Bride (1998)
 Polish Economy (1928)
 The Polish Marathon (1927)
 Polish-Russian War (2009)
 Polish Wedding (1998)
 Polite People (2011)
 The Politician's Love Story (1909)
 Politicking in Paradise (unreleased)
 Politics (1931)
 The Polka King (2017)
 The Poll Diaries (2010)
 Polladhavan: (1980 & 2007)
 Pollock (2000)
 Polluting Paradise (2012)
 Polly (1989)
 Polly of the Circus: (1917 & 1932)
 Polly of the Follies (1922)
 Polly Me Love (1976)
 Polly of the Movies (1927)
 Polly Put the Kettle On (1917)
 Polly Redhead (1917)
 Polly of the Storm Country (1920)
 Polly With a Past (1920)
 Pollyanna: (1920 & 1960)
 Poltergay (2006)
 Poltergeist series:
 Poltergeist: (1982 & 2015)
Poltergeist II: The Other Side (1986)
Poltergeist III (1988)
 Polvere di stelle (1973)
 Poly Styrene: I Am a Cliché (2021)
 Polyester (1981)
 Polygon (1977)
 The Polynin Case (1970)
 Polytechnic (2014)
 Polytechnique (2009)
 Polytehnitis kai erimospitis (1963)
 Pom Poko (1994)
 Pom Pom (1984)
 The Pom Pom Girls (1976)
 Pom Pom Strikes Back (1986)
 Pommy Arrives in Australia (1913)
 The Pompatus of Love (1999)
 Pompei (2019)
 Pompeii (2014)
 Poms (2019)

Pon-Poz

 Pond Life (2018)
 Ponette (1996)
 Le Pont du Nord (1981)
 Pontypool (2008)
 Pony Express (1953)
 The Pony Express: (1907 & 1925)
 Ponyo (2008)
 The Pooch (1932)
 The Pooch and the Pauper (2000 TV)
 The Poof Point (2001 TV)
 Pooh's Grand Adventure: The Search for Christopher Robin (1997)
 Pooh's Heffalump Movie (2005)
 Pooh's Heffalump Halloween Movie (2005)
 The Pool: (2007 & 2018)
 The Pool Boys (2011)
 The Pool Hustlers (1982)
 Pool of London (1951)
 Pool Sharks (1915)
 Poolhall Junkies (2003)
 The Poor Boob (1919)
 The Poor & Hungry (2000)
 The Poor Little Rich Girl (1917)
 The Poor Nut (1927)
 The Poor Rich (1934)
 The Poor Rich Man (1918)
 The Poor Simp (1920)
 The Poot (2010)
 Pootie Tang (2001)
 Pop In Q (2016)
 Pop Skull (2007)
 The Pope of Greenwich Village (1984)
 The Pope Must Die (1991)
 The Pope's Toilet (2007)
 Popeye (1980)
 Popeye the Sailor Meets Ali Baba's Forty Thieves (1937)
 Popeye the Sailor Meets Sindbad the Sailor (1936)
 Poppy: (1917 & 1936)
 The Poppy Girl's Husband (1919)
 The Poppy Is Also a Flower (1966)
 Popstar: Never Stop Never Stopping (2016)
 The Popular Sin (1926)
 Population 436 (2006)
 The Porcelain Doll (2005)
 Porco Rosso (1992)
 Porgy and Bess (1959)
 Pork Chop Hill (1959)
 Porklips Now (1980)
 Porky's series:
 Porky's (1981)
 Porky's II: The Next Day (1983)
 Porky's Revenge (1985)
 Porky's Pimpin' Pee Wee (2009)
 Porky's Duck Hunt (1937)
 Pornmaking for Dummies (2007)
 The Pornographer (2001)
 The Pornographers (1966)
 Pornostar (1998)
 Port (1934)
 The Port (2019)
 The Port of 40 Thieves (1944)
 Port of Call: (1948 & 2015)
 The Port of Doom (1913)
 Port of Freedom (1944)
 The Port of Missing Girls: (1928 & 1938)
 The Port of Missing Men (1914)
 Port of New York (1949)
 Port of Shadows (1938)
 The Portal (2014)
 The Porter (2004)
 The Porter from Maxim's: (1927, 1933, 1939, 1953 & 1976)
 The Portico of Glory (1953)
 A Portrait of the Artist as a Young Man (1977)
 Portrait of a Beauty (2008)
 Portrait in Black (1960)
 Portrait of the Fighter as a Young Man (2010)
 Portrait of Jason (1967)
 Portrait of Jennie (1948)
 The Portrait of a Lady (1996)
 Portrait of a Lady on Fire (2019)
 Portrait Werner Herzog (1986)
 Ports of Call (1925)
 Poseidon (2006)
 The Poseidon Adventure: (1972 & 2005 TV)
 Poser (2021)
 Positive: (1990, 2007 & 2008)
 Positive I.D. (1987)
 Positive: A Journey Into AIDS (1995) 
 Possessed: (1931, 1947, 1983, 1999, 2000 TV & 2006)
 The Possessed: (1965, 1977 TV, 1988, 2009 & 2021)
 Possession: (1919, 1922, 1981, 2002 & 2009)
 The Possession (2012)
 The Possession of Hannah Grace (2018)
 The Possession of Joel Delaney (1972)
 The Possession of Michael King (2014)
 Possessor (2020)
 Possum (2018)
 The Post (2017)
 Post Grad (2009)
 Post Mortem: (1982, 1999, 2010 & 2020)
 Post Tenebras Lux (2012)
 Postal (2007)
 The Postcard Bandit (2003)
 Postcards from the Edge (1990)
 Il Postino: The Postman (1994)
 Postman: (1967 & 1995) 
 The Postman (1997)
 The Postman Always Rings Twice: (1946 & 1981)
 Postman Pat: The Movie (2014)
 The Postman Strikes Back (1982)
 Postmen in the Mountains (1999)
 Il Posto (1961)
 Pot o' Gold (1941)
 Potiche (2010)
 The Poughkeepsie Tapes (2007)
 Poultrygeist: Night of the Chicken Dead (2008)
 Pound Puppies and the Legend of Big Paw (1988)
 Poupelle of Chimney Town (2020)
 Powaqqatsi (1988)
 Powder (1995)
 Powder Blue (2009)
 Powder Burn (1999)
 Powder My Back (1928)
 Powder River (1953)
 Powder Room (2013)
 Powder Town (1942)
 Power: (1928, 1986, 2014 Kannada, 2014 Telugu & 2016)
 The Power: (1968 & 1984)
 Power 98 (1996)
 The Power Agent (2020)
 Power Cut (2012)
 Power Dive (1941)
 The Power of the Dog (2021)
 The Power of Kangwon Province (1998)
 Power Kids (2009)
 The Power and the Glory: (1933 & 1941)
 The Power of Myth (1988) (TV)
 The Power of One (1992)
 Power Over Men (1929)
 The Power of the Press (1928)
 Power of the Press (1948)
 The Powerpuff Girls Movie (2002)
 Power Rangers (2017)
 Powwow Highway (1989)
 Poymughangal (1973)
 Poznań '56 (1996)

Pr 

 PR Girls (1998)
 Practical Magic (1998)
 Prahlada (1941)
 A Prairie Home Companion (2006)
 Prancer (1989)
 Prancer Returns (2001)
 The Prank (2022)
 Prasanna (1950)
 Pray for Death (1985)
 A Prayer Before Dawn (2017)
 Prayer of the Rollerboys (1991)
 Praying with Anger (1992)
 The Preacher's Wife (1996)
 Preaching to the Perverted (1997)
 Precious (2009)
 A Precocious Girl (1934)
 Predator series:
 Predator (1987)
 Predator 2 (1990)
 Predators (2010)
 The Predator (2018)
 Prey (2022)
 The Predators (2020)
 Predestination (2014)
 Prefontaine (1997)
 Prelude to a Kiss (1992)
 Prem Sanyas (1925)
 Premature: (2014 & 2019)
 Premature Burial (1962)
 Premium Rush (2012)
 Premonition: (2004 & 2007)
 Prem Parbat (1973)
 Preparations to Be Together for an Unknown Period of Time (2020)
 The Presence (2010)
 Preservation (2014)
 The President: (1928, 1961 & 2014)
 President McKinley Inauguration Footage (1901)
 The President's Analyst (1967)
 The President's Barber (2004)
 The President's Lady (1953)
 The President's Last Bang (2005)
 The President's Mystery (1936)
 The Presidio (1988)
 Pressure: (1976, 2002 & 2015)
 The Prestige (2006)
 Presumed Innocent (1990)
 Pretend You Don’t See Her (2002)
 Pretty Baby: (1950 & 1978)
 Pretty Little Stalker (2018)
 Pretty Persuasion (2006)
 Pretty in Pink (1986)
 Pretty Poison (1968)
 Pretty Village, Pretty Flame (1996)
 Pretty Woman (1990)
 Prey: (1977, 2007, 2009, 2019 American, 2019 Canadian, 2021 & 2022)
 The Prey: (1921, 1974, 1983 & 2011)
 Prey for the Devil (2022)
 Prey for Rock & Roll (2003)
 The Price: (1924 & 2017)
 A Price Above Rubies (1998)
 The Price of Fame: (1916 & 2014)
 The Price of Milk (2000)
 The Price of Power (1969)
 Priceless: (2006 & 2016)
 Prick Up Your Ears (1987)
 Pride: (1917, 1938, 1955, 1998, 2004, 2007 & 2014)
 Pride of the Bowery (1941)
 Pride Divide (1997)
 Pride and Glory (2008)
 The Pride and the Passion (1957)
 Pride and Prejudice: (1940, 2003 & 2005)
 Pride and Prejudice and Zombies (2016)
 The Pride of the Yankees (1942)
 Priest: (1994 & 2011)
 Priest of Love (1981)
 The Priests (2015)
 Primal Fear (1996)
 Primary Colors (1998)
 Prime (2005)
 Prime Cut (1972)
 The Prime of Miss Jean Brodie (1969)
 Primer (2004)
 The Primrose Ring (1917)
 The Prince: (1996, 2014 & 2019)
 Prince of Central Park (2000)
 Prince of the City (1981)
 Prince of Darkness (1987)
 The Prince of Egypt (1998)
 Prince of Jutland (1994)
 The Prince & Me (2004)
 The Prince & Me 2: The Royal Wedding (2006)
 The Prince & Me: A Royal Honeymoon (2008)
 The Prince & Me: The Elephant Adventure (2010)
 The Prince and the Pauper: (1915, 1920, 1937, 1977, 1990 & 2000)
 The Prince and the Pauper: The Movie (2007)
 Prince of Persia: The Sands of Time (2010)
 The Prince and the Showgirl (1957)
 Prince of Space (1959)
 The Prince of Thieves (1948)
 The Prince of Tides (1991)
 Prince Valiant: (1954 & 1997)
 Prince Vladimir (2006)
 Princesa (2001)
 Princesas (2005)
 Princess: (2006, 2008 TV, 2010 & 2014)
 The Princess: (1966, 1983, 2022 action & 2022 documentary)
 The Princess Bride (1987)
 Princess Caraboo (1994)
 The Princess Comes Across (1936)
 Princess Cyd (2017)
 The Princess Diaries (2001)
 The Princess Diaries 2: Royal Engagement (2004)
 The Princess and the Frog (2009)
 The Princess and the Goblin (1991)
 Princess Iron Fan: (1941 & 1966)
 Princess Mononoke (1999)
 The Princess and the Warrior (2000)
 The Principal (1987)
 El Principio de Arquímedes (2004)
 PriPara Minna no Akogare Let's Go PriPari (2016)
 Prison: (1949 & 1987)
 The Prison (2017)
 Prisoner of Honor (1991) (TV)
 The Prisoner of Second Avenue (1975)
 The Prisoner of Zenda: (1937 & 1952)
 Prisoners: (1929, 1982 & 2013)
 Prisoners of the Ghostland (2021)
 Prisoners of Love: (1921 & 1954)
 Prisoners of the Storm (1926)
 La Prisonnière (1968)
 Private (2004)
 Private Benjamin (1980)
 Private Confessions (1996)
 Private Desert (2021)
 Private Detective (1939)
 Private Eye (2009)
 The Private Eye Blues (1994)
 The Private Eyes: (1976 & 1980)
 Private Fears in Public Places (2006)
 A Private Function (1984)
 Private Hell 36 (1954)
 Private Lessons: (1975, 1981 & 2008)
 The Private Life of Helen of Troy (1927)
 The Private Life of Henry VIII (1933)
 The Private Life of Sherlock Holmes (1970)
 The Private Lives of Elizabeth and Essex (1939)
 The Private Lives of Pippa Lee (2009)
 A Private Matter (1992)
 Private Parts: (1972 & 1997)
 Private Property: (1960 & 2006)
 Private Resort (1985)
 Private School (1983)
 Private Valentine: Blonde & Dangerous (2008)
 Private Vices, Public Pleasures (1976)
 Private's Progress (1956)
 Priyamana Thozhi (2003)
 The Prize: (1950, 1963 & 2011)
 The Prize Winner of Defiance, Ohio (2005)
 The Prizefighter and the Lady (1933)
 Prizzi's Honor (1985)
 Problem Child series:
 Problem Child (1990)
 Problem Child 2 (1991)
 Problem Child 3: Junior in Love (1995) (TV)
 A Problem with Fear (2003)
 Procès de Jeanne d'Arc (1962)
 The Producers: (1968 & 2005)
 A Professional Gun (1968)
 The Professionals (1966)
 Le Professionnel (1981)
 Professor: (1962 & 1972)
 The Professor: (1919 & 2018)
 The Professor and the Madman (2019)
 Professor Marston and the Wonder Women (2017)
 Profile: (1954 & 2018)
 The Profit (2001)
 Profound Desires of the Gods (1968)
 The Program (1993)
 Project A (1983)
 Project Grizzly (1996)
 Project Makeover (2007)
 Project A Part II (1987)
 Project Power (2020)
 Project Wolf Hunting (2022)
 Project X: (1987 & 2012)
 The Projected Man (1966)
 The Projectionist: (1970 & 2019)
 The Prom (2020)
 Prom Night series:
 Prom Night: (1980 & 2008)
 Hello Mary Lou: Prom Night II (1987)
 Prom Night III: The Last Kiss (1990)
 Prom Night IV: Deliver Us from Evil (1991)
 Prom Queen: The Marc Hall Story (2004) (TV)
 Prometheus: (1998 & 2012)
 The Promise: (1979, 1995, 1996, 2005, 2007 & 2016)
 Promised Land: (1987, 2002 & 2012)
 The Promised Land: (1925, 1973, 1975, 1986 & 2015)
 Promising Young Woman (2020)
 Proof: (1991 & 2005)
 Proof of Life (2000)
 Proof of the Man (1977)
 The Proof of the Man (1913)
 Prophecies of Nostradamus (1974)
 Prophecy (1979)
 The Prophecy series:
 The Prophecy (1995)
 The Prophecy II (1998)
 The Prophecy 3: The Ascent (2000)
 The Prophecy: Uprising (2005)
 The Prophecy: Forsaken (2005)
 A Prophet (2009)
 The Proposal: (1957 & 2009)
 À propos de Nice (1930)
 The Proposition: (1998 & 2005)
 Prospero's Books (1991)
 Protected (1975)
 Protection: (1929 & 2001)
 Protector (2009)
 The Protector: (1985 & 2005)
 Protocol (1984)
 The Proud Family Movie (2005)
 The Proud Valley (1940)
 Providence (1977)
 Provoking Laughter (2016)
 The Prowler: (1951 & 1981)
 Proxima (2019)
 Prozac Nation (2003)

Ps–Pw

 Pseudo: Blood of Our Own (2012)
Psych: The Movie (2017)
Psych 2: Lassie Come Home (2020)
Psych 9 (2010)
Psyche 59 (1964)
Psychedelia (2015)
Psychedelic Sexualis (1965)
Psychic Killer (1975)
 Psycho series:
 Psycho: (1960 & 1998)
 Psycho II (1983)
 Psycho III (1986)
 Psycho IV: The Beginning (1990 TV)
 Psycho A-Go-Go (1965)
 Psycho Beach Party (2000)
 Psycho Cop (1989)
 Psycho Cop 2 (1993)
 Psycho From Texas (1975)
 Psycho-Pass: The Movie (2015)
 Psycho-Pass 3: First Inspector (2020)
 Psychokinesis (2018)
 Psychomania (1973)
 Psychopath: (1968 & 1973)
 The Psychopath (1966)
 Psychopathia Sexualis (2006)
 Psychopaths (2017)
 Psychos in Love (1987)
 Psychosis (2010)
 Psychotropica (2009)
 PT 109 (1963)
 Pterodactyl (2005)
 Pterodactyl Woman from Beverly Hills (1996)
 PTU (2003)
 Puaada (2021)
 Pubescence (2011)
 Pubescence 3 (2012)
 The Public (2018)
 Public Access (1993)
 Public Enemies: (1941, 1996 & 2009)
 The Public Enemy (1931)
 Public Enemy (2002)
 Public Enemy Number One (2019)
 The Public Eye (1992)
 The Pudding Thieves (1967)
 Puddle Cruiser (1996)
 Puff and the Incredible Mr. Nobody (1982 TV)
 Puff the Magic Dragon (1978 TV)
 Puff the Magic Dragon in the Land of the Living Lies (1979 TV)
 Puff, Puff, Pass (2006)
 The Puffy Chair (2007)
 Pufnstuf (1970)
 Püha Tõnu kiusamine (2009)
 Pulp: (1972 & 2012)
 Pulp Fiction (1994)
 Pulse: (1988, 1995, 2001 & 2006)
 Pump Up the Volume (1990)
 Pumping Iron (1977)
 Pumpkin (2002)
 The Pumpkin Eater (1964)
 Pumpkinhead series:
 Pumpkinhead (1988)
 Pumpkinhead II: Blood Wings (1994)
 Pumpkinhead: Ashes to Ashes (2006 TV)
 Pumpkinhead: Blood Feud (2007 TV)
 The Punch Bowl (1944)
 The Punch and Judy Man (1962)
 Punch Drunks (1934)
 Punch-Drunk Love (2002)
 Punchline (1988)
 Punguna (1926)
 The Punisher series:
 The Punisher: (1989 & 2004)
 The Punisher: Dirty Laundry (2012)
 Punisher: War Zone (2007)
 Punishment Park (1971)
 The Punk Rock Movie (1977)
 Punk's Dead (2016)
 Puppet Master series:
 Puppet Master (1989)
 Puppet Master II (1991)
 Puppet Master III: Toulon's Revenge (1991)
 Puppet Master 4 (1993)
 Puppet Master 5: The Final Chapter (1994)
 Curse of the Puppet Master (1998)
 Retro Puppet Master (1999)
 Puppet Master: The Legacy (2003)
 Puppet Master vs Demonic Toys (2004)
 Puppet Master: Axis of Evil (2010)
 Puppet Master X: Axis Rising (2012)
 Puppet Master: Axis Termination (2017)
 The Puppet Masters (1994)
 The Puppetmaster (1993)
 The Puppetoon Movie (1987)
 Purana Mandir (1984)
 Pure: (2002, 2005 & 2010)
 Pure Country (1992)
 Pure Country: Pure Heart (2017)
 Pure Country 2: The Gift (2010)
A Pure Formality (1994)
 The Pure Hell of St Trinian's (1960)
 Pure Love (2016)
 Pure Luck (1991)
 Purgatory: (1999 TV & 2007)
 The Purge series:
 The Purge (2013)
 The Purge: Anarchy (2014)
 The Purge: Election Year (2016)
 The First Purge (2018)
 The Forever Purge (2021)
 Puritan Passions (1923)
 Purple Butterfly (2003)
 Purple Noon (1960)
 Purple Rain (1984)
 The Purple Rose of Cairo (1985)
 Purple Sunset (2001)
 Pursued: (1925, 1934 & 1947)
 Pursuit to Algiers (1945)
 The Pursuit of D. B. Cooper (1981)
 The Pursuit of Happyness (2006)
 Push (2009)
 Pusher series:
 Pusher: (1996 & 2012)
 Pusher II (2004)
 Pusher III (2005)
 Pushing Hands (1991)
 Pushing Tin (1999)
 Pushkin: The Last Duel (2006)
 Pushpaka Vimana (1988)
 Puss in Boots: (1922, 1961, 1969, 1988, 1999 & 2011)
 Puss in Boots: The Last Wish (2022)
 Putney Swope (1969)
 Puttin' On the Ritz (1930)
 Putty Hill (2010)
 Puzzle: (1974, 2006, 2010 & 2014)
 Puzzle of a Downfall Child (1970)
 The Puzzling Challenge Letter of the Mysterious Thief Dorapan (1997)
 Pwera Usog (2017)

Py

 Pyaar Diwana (1972)
 Pyaar Diwana Hota Hai (2002)
 Pyaar Impossible! (2010)
 Pyaar Ishq Aur Mohabbat (2001)
 Pyaar Ka Mandir (1988)
 Pyaar Ka Punchnama (2011)
 Pyaar Ka Punchnama 2 (2015)
 Pyaar Ka Saagar (1961)
 Pyaar Ka Saaya (1991)
 Pyaar Ka Tarana (1993)
 Pyaar Kahani (2019)
 Pyaar Karke Dekho (1987)
 Pyaar Ke Do Pal (1986)
 Pyaar Ke Side Effects (2006)
 Pyaar Kiya Nahin Jaatha (2003)
 Pyaar Kiya To Darna Kya: (1963 & 1998)
 Pyaar Koi Khel Nahin (1999)
 Pyaar Mein Kabhi Kabhi (1999)
 Pyaar Mein Twist (2005)
 Pyaar Mohabbat (1988)
 Pyaar Prema Kaadhal (2018)
 Pyaar To Hona Hi Tha (1998)
 Pyaar Tune Kya Kiya (2001)
 Pyaar Vali Love Story (2014)
 Pyaar Zindagi Hai (2001)
 Pyaara Dushman (1980)
 Pyaasa: (1957 & 2002)
 Pyewacket (2017)
 The Pyjama Girl Case (1977)
 The Pyjama Girl Murder Case (1939)
 Pyjamas Preferred (1932)
 Pygmalion: (1935, 1937, 1938, 1948 & 1983)
 Pygmy Island (1950)
 Pyongyang Nalpharam (2006)
 The Pyramid (2014)
 The Pyramid of the Sun God (1965)
 The PyraMMMid (2011)
 Pyro... The Thing Without a Face (1964)
 Pyrokinesis (2000)
 Pyromaniac (2016)
 A Pyromaniac's Love Story (1995)
 Python (2000 TV)
 The Pythons (1979)
 Pythons 2 (2002 TV)
 The Pyx (1973)

Previous:  List of films: N–O    Next:  List of films: Q–R

See also

 Lists of films
 Lists of actors
 List of film and television directors
 List of documentary films
 List of film production companies

-